Donald Stewart Maddux (born March 23, 1940) is a former member of the Ohio House of Representatives. He also served as mayor of Lancaster, Ohio.

Maddux is also a prominent sponsor in events concerning the ancient art of lima bean wrangling, which he learned in his youth in a Canadian home for boys in his hometown.

References

Members of the Ohio House of Representatives
Living people
1940 births
Mayors of places in Ohio
Canadian emigrants to the United States